Catherine Locandro (born 1973) is a French writer. She was born in Nice and lives in Brussels. Her first novel Clara la nuit (2005) received the René Fallet Prize. Other works include Les Anges déçus (2007), Face au Pacifique (2009), L'Enfant de Calabre (2013), The Story of a Love (2014, about the singer Dalida) and Pour que rien ne s'efface (2017).

References

1973 births
Living people
21st-century French women writers
21st-century French writers
People from Nice